Kevin Haslam (born November 8, 1986) is an American football offensive tackle who is currently a free agent. He was signed by the Jacksonville Jaguars as an undrafted free agent in 2010. He played college football at Rutgers.

Professional career

Jacksonville Jaguars
Haslam was signed as an undrafted free agent by the Jacksonville Jaguars after the 2010 NFL Draft. Haslam and two other undrafted free agents made the Jaguars' opening day roster. He played in five games for the Jaguars before being put on injured reserve. He was released on March 13, 2012.

Oakland Raiders
Haslam was signed by the Oakland Raiders on May 13, 2012, but was released on August 31, 2012 in the final wave of roster cuts.

San Diego Chargers
Haslam was signed by the San Diego Chargers on September 4, 2012, as the final member of the practice squad. He was promoted to the active squad in week 12 and played in five games for the Chargers, starting three at left tackle. He was released on May 21, 2013 to make room on the roster for Max Starks.

New England Patriots
Haslam was claimed off waivers by the New England Patriots on May 23, 2013. On August 15, 2013, he was released by the Patriots.

Detroit Lions
On August 18, 2013, Haslam was signed by the Detroit Lions. He was cut on August 31.

Personal life
He resides in Mahwah, New Jersey. He attended Mahwah High School.

References

1986 births
Living people
American football offensive tackles
Detroit Lions players
Jacksonville Jaguars players
Mahwah High School alumni

New England Patriots players
Oakland Raiders players
Rutgers Scarlet Knights football players
San Diego Chargers players
People from Mahwah, New Jersey
Players of American football from New Jersey
Sportspeople from Bergen County, New Jersey